BSCS may refer to:

Biological Sciences Curriculum Study, an educational center
Bachelor of Science in Computer Science
Bradley Stoke Community School in the United Kingdom
Black Sea Coastal States, Bulgaria, Georgia, Romania, Russia, Turkey, and Ukraine
Business Control and Support Systems, mobile telecom billing system